The Lurín River is a  long watercourse located in the Lima Region of Peru. It originates in the glaciers and lagoons of the western Andes. It is known as the Chalilla River until joining the Taquía creek where it receives its common name. Its main tributaries are the Taquía, Llacomayqui, Tinajas, Numinkancha and Kanchawara on its left bank and the Chamacna on its right bank. It crosses the provinces Huarochirí and Lima in the Lima region before emptying into the Pacific Ocean.

References

Rivers of Peru
Rivers of Lima Region